Split: Facing New York/Amity is a 2004 split/EP release by San Francisco group Facing New York and the Los Angeles based Amity.

Track listing

"Paper Shepherd"– 3:56 (Facing New York)
"With a Grain of Salt"– 3:57 (Amity)
"Today (It Ends)"– 4:26 (Facing New York)
"This Song Is Low Carb"– 2:51 (Amity)
"Roman Son"– 6:47 (Facing New York)
"Mondee Le Sauve'' - 4:02 (Amity)

References

Split EPs
Facing New York albums
2004 EPs